The 1901 U.S. Open was the seventh U.S. Open, held June 14–17 at Myopia Hunt Club in South Hamilton, Massachusetts, northeast of Boston. Willie Anderson won the first of his four U.S. Open titles in a playoff over Alex Smith.

Smith led after the first two rounds on Friday at 164, with Anderson three strokes back in third place. After the third round on Saturday morning, Stewart Gardner led at 249, with Anderson a stroke behind and Smith one back in third at 251. Garder had an 85 in the afternoon and fell to fourth. Both Anderson and Smith posted total scores of 331, the highest winning score in U.S. Open history, with Smith narrowly missing a putt at the 18th to win the championship in regulation.

The playoff, the first in U.S. Open history, was pushed back to Monday because Sunday was reserved for member play. Smith jumped out to a three-stroke lead at the turn and led by five shots with fives holes to play. He went 5-7-5-4 over the next four holes, while Anderson recorded all fours to even up the match. At the 18th, Anderson found the green in two while Smith's approach landed in the rough. Anderson finished with an 85, a stroke better than Smith.

Smith's brother Willie, the 1899 champion, finished in third place, two shots out of the playoff. Myopia club pro John Jones was twelfth, then caddied for Anderson during the playoff. For the only time in U.S. Open history, no player managed to break 80 in any round.

Anderson would go on to win a record four U.S. Open titles in five years, including three consecutive (1903–1905), yet to be repeated. His four titles have been matched by three others: Bobby Jones, Ben Hogan, and Jack Nicklaus.

Past champions in the field 

Source:

Did not play: Harry Vardon (1900), Fred Herd (1898).

Round summaries

First round
Friday, June 15, 1901 (morning)

Source:

Second round
Friday, June 15, 1901 (afternoon)

Source:

Third round
Saturday, June 15, 1901 (morning)

Source:

Final round
Saturday, June 15, 1901 (afternoon)

Source:

Playoff
Monday, June 17, 1901

Source:

References

External links
USGA Championship Database

U.S. Open (golf)
U.S. Open (golf)
U.S. Open
Golf in Massachusetts
Hamilton, Massachusetts
Events in Essex County, Massachusetts
U.S. Open (golf)
Sports competitions in Massachusetts
Sports in Essex County, Massachusetts
Tourist attractions in Essex County, Massachusetts
U.S. Open (golf)